"Dime" is the third single from Cuban American rap artist Pitbull's album El Mariel. It is also labeled as "Tell Me" (Dime, translated in English). The album version features Ken-Y as the singer on the hook, while the radio edit has been redone with Frankie J. The original version of this song is by Ken-Y and is featured on his debut album as a part of the reggaeton duo R.K.M & Ken-Y: Masterpiece.

Charts

Weekly charts

Year-end charts

References

2006 singles
Pitbull (rapper) songs
R.K.M & Ken-Y songs
Spanish-language songs
Contemporary R&B ballads
Songs written by Pitbull (rapper)
2006 songs